Jerry D. Paxton is an American politician and a Republican member of the Wyoming House of Representatives representing District 47 since January 8, 2013.

Education
Paxton earned his BS in agricultural education and his MS in vocational education from the University of Wyoming.

Elections
2012 When Republican Representative Jeb Steward retired and left the District 47 seat open, Paxton was unopposed for the August 21, 2012 Republican Primary, winning with 1,219 votes, and won the November 6, 2012 General election with 3,019 votes (74.4%) against Libertarian candidate Michael Hendricks.

References

External links
Official page at the Wyoming Legislature
Campaign site
 

Place of birth missing (living people)
Year of birth missing (living people)
Living people
Republican Party members of the Wyoming House of Representatives
University of Wyoming alumni
21st-century American politicians